California Bank & Trust (CB&T) is a full-service bank specializing in consumer, commercial and wealth  management services headquartered in San Diego, California. With more than 80 branches located throughout California, CB&T is a subsidiary of Zions Bancorporation, one of the nation's top 50 bank holding companies, with assets of approximately $91 billion.

History

California Bank & Trust was created in October 1998 as the result of the merger of three institutions acquired separately by Zions Bancorporation:  Sumitomo Bank of California, San Diego-based Grossmont Bank and First Pacific National Bank.

The institution continued to grow with the acquisition of Fresno, California-based Regency Bank in 1999. In 2001, the company expanded its footprint with the addition of Eldorado Bancshares, which included Eldorado's two subsidiaries, Eldorado Bank and Antelope Valley Bank.

More recent acquisitions include Alliance Bank and Vineyard Bank, which were acquired when the Federal Deposit Insurance Corporation (FDIC) closed these institutions in 2009. Through this transaction, California Bank & Trust acquired Alliance Bank's $951 million of deposits and $1.14 billion of assets, and up to $225 million of the sold bank's credits.

Operations

California Bank & Trust operates through a network of more than 80 branches run through four administrative offices. These include Irvine, Los Angeles, Oakland, and the bank's main headquarters in San Diego.

CB&T vision, mission & values
Vision: Creating California's best banking relationships.

Mission: We champion the people and businesses building California, through our team of knowledgeable bankers and custom financial solutions.

Corporate values:
 Build lasting relationships
 Strengthen our communities
 Thrive as a diverse team
 Act as owners

Corporate social responsibility
In 2012, California Bank & Trust was rated as "outstanding" by the FDIC for its performance under the Community Reinvestment Act (CRA) and, in 2011, was a "preferred SBA lender" as designated by the Small Business Administration.

In 2012, California Bank & Trust employees raised over $95,000 for the United Way and $101,000 in 2013. In April 2012, CB&T announced a new business financing initiative focused on minority and women-owned businesses in California called TEAM (Tools, Education, Access and Mentoring). The initiative was launched in affiliation with Latina Style, Inc. and the Anna Maria Arias Foundation, a foundation working to ensure the growth, reach and impact of Latina entrepreneurs by providing programs, services and resources that help Latinas establish successful businesses.

In December 2018, CB&T donated $25,000 to the United Way in support of communities and individuals impacted by the Camp Fire in Northern California, and the Woolsey and Hill Fires in Southern California.

In September 2019, CB&T presented a check in the amount of $10,000 to the Boys and Girls Club of Greater San Diego in support of the non-profit's signature event – "An Evening of Changing Lives."

In August 2021, More than CB&T 115 employees participated in their first-ever “Give Day” – an event focused on the bank's associates giving back to their communities through charitable acts and volunteerism. CB&T associates contributed to in-person and hands-on volunteer activities, including food sorting, mural painting and homebuilding. Additionally, all CB&T locations participated in donation collections.

In November 2021, The Old Globe in San Diego, CA announced that CB&T has given more than $1 million to the theatre since 1987 and has been named an Extraordinary Leader, recognized in the Globe's program book and with a paver on the Globe's Copley Plaza.

In June 2022, CB&T and its employees raised nearly $80,000 for its 2022 CB&T Giving Campaign. CB&T employees raised $60,000 for 92 non-profit organizations across California. An additional $20,000 corporate donation from CB&T was donated to organizations partnered with United Way.

Honors and accolades
The bank has been recognized by Greenwich Associates, a leading global financial services research and consulting firm, which has awarded California Bank & Trust 18 Excellence and Best Brand Awards for small business and middle market banking as a part of Zions Bancorporation. In addition, California Bank & Trust was voted San Diego's “Best Bank” for 11 straight years and “Best Commercial Bank” for 8 years by The San Diego Union-Tribune Reader's Poll. The Orange County Register has also named California Bank & Trust as a winner of Best Bank in Orange County for 8 consecutive years and Best Home Loan Provider for the first year in the annual poll.

References

External links
 

Banks based in California
Banks based in Utah
American companies established in 1998
Banks established in 1998
Companies based in San Diego
1998 establishments in California